Maple River Township may refer to:

 Maple River Township, Carroll County, Iowa
 Maple River Township, Michigan
 Maple River Township, Cass County, North Dakota, in Cass County, North Dakota

Township name disambiguation pages